The Durham School was a historic schoolhouse on Durham Road (County Road 183) in Durham, Arkansas.  It was a single-story Craftsman style stone structure, with a gable roof, and entrances at the opposite gable ends.  Built in 1829, the school had three classrooms and space for a teacher's living quarters.  It was used until the Durham school district was consolidated into that of Elkins in 1948.  It was listed on the National Register of Historic Places in 1982.  The building has since been destroyed by fire, and was delisted from the Register in 2018.

See also
National Register of Historic Places listings in Washington County, Arkansas

References

American Craftsman architecture in Arkansas
School buildings on the National Register of Historic Places in Arkansas
Schools in Washington County, Arkansas
Demolished buildings and structures in Arkansas
National Register of Historic Places in Washington County, Arkansas
Former National Register of Historic Places in Arkansas
1829 establishments in Arkansas Territory
2018 disestablishments in Arkansas
School buildings in the United States destroyed by arson
School buildings completed in 1829